Rúben Rafael de Sousa Ferreira (born 17 February 1990) is a Portuguese professional footballer who plays as a full-back (especially on the left flank).

References

External links

1990 births
Living people
Sportspeople from Funchal
Portuguese footballers
Madeiran footballers
Association football defenders
Primeira Liga players
Liga Portugal 2 players
Segunda Divisão players
C.F. União players
C.S. Marítimo players
Vitória S.C. players
Vitória S.C. B players
G.D. Chaves players
S.C. Covilhã players
Portugal youth international footballers
Portugal under-21 international footballers